Garmeh Khani may refer to:

Garmeh Khani, Delfan, Lorestan Province, Iran
Garmeh Khani, Kakavand, Lorestan Province, Iran
Garmeh Khani, Kuhdasht, Lorestan Province, Iran